Coleophora sisteronica is a moth of the family Coleophoridae. It is found in southern France, Spain and Italy.

The larvae feed on Coronilla minima. They create a dark brown composite leaf case of 2.5–4 mm with a mouth angle of 45°. The case is composed of about ten mined leaflets. The mouth opening is shifted laterally, so the case lies on its side on the leaf. Larvae can be found from autumn to May. The species is nocturnal.

References

sisteronica
Moths of Europe
Moths described in 1961